Julie Dorsey is an American computer scientist specializing in computer graphics. With architecture as a driving application, her research in computer graphics has included work on high-dynamic-range imaging, image-based modeling and rendering, and billboarding. She is the Frederick W. Beinecke Professor of Computer Science at Yale University, and the founder and Chief Scientist of 3D sketching software company Mental Canvas.

Education and career
Dorsey was an undergraduate at Cornell University, where she earned bachelor's degrees in both architecture and computer science.
She completed her Ph.D. in computer science at Cornell in 1993. Her dissertation, Computer Graphics Techniques For Opera Lighting Design And Simulation, was supervised by Donald P. Greenberg.

She was a tenured professor of computer science and engineering and architecture at the Massachusetts Institute of Technology before moving to Yale in 2002.

Contributions
Dorsey is the co-author of the book Digital Modeling of Material Appearance (with Holly Rushmeier and François Sillion, Morgan Kaufmann, 2008). She was editor-in-chief of ACM Transactions on Graphics from 2012 to 2014.

Recognition
Dorsey was the winner of the Richard Kelly Award of the Illuminating Engineering Society of North America, and the Harold E. Edgerton Faculty Achievement Award of the Massachusetts Institute of Technology. In 2018 she was a winner of the Microsoft Female Founders Competition, providing venture capital to fund her company Mental Canvas.

References

External links
Home page

Year of birth missing (living people)
Living people
American computer scientists
American women computer scientists
Computer graphics researchers
Cornell University alumni
MIT School of Architecture and Planning faculty
Yale University faculty
MIT School of Engineering faculty
American women academics
21st-century American women